Joel Miller (born 15 December 1988) is a British volleyball player. Born in Bury, Greater Manchester, England, he competed for Great Britain in the men's tournament at the 2012 Summer Olympics.

References

English men's volleyball players
Volleyball players at the 2012 Summer Olympics
Olympic volleyball players of Great Britain
1988 births
Living people
Sportspeople from Bury, Greater Manchester